The 2022 United Rentals 200 was the fourth stock car race of the 2022 NASCAR Xfinity Series and the 18th iteration of the event. The race was held on Saturday, March 12, 2022, in Avondale, Arizona at Phoenix Raceway, a 1.0 mile (1.6 km) permanent tri-oval racetrack. The race was run over 200 laps. Noah Gragson of JR Motorsports would dominate, leading 114 laps, and winning the race. This was Gragson's sixth career win in the Xfinity Series, and his first of the season. To fill out the podium, Brandon Jones of Joe Gibbs Racing and Josh Berry of JR Motorsports would finish 2nd and 3rd, respectively.

Background 
Phoenix Raceway is a 1-mile, low-banked tri-oval race track located in Avondale, Arizona, near Phoenix. The motorsport track opened in 1964 and currently hosts two NASCAR race weekends annually. Phoenix Raceway has also hosted the CART, IndyCar Series, USAC and the WeatherTech SportsCar Championship. The raceway is currently owned and operated by NASCAR.

Entry list

Practice 
The only 30-minute practice session was held on Saturday, March 12, at 9:30 AM MST.

Qualifying 
Qualifying was held on Saturday, March 12, at 10:00 AM MST. Since Phoenix Raceway is a tri-oval track, the qualifying system used is a single-car, single-lap system with only one round. Whoever sets the fastest time in the round wins the pole.

Full qualifying results

Race results 
Stage 1 Laps: 45

Stage 2 Laps: 45

Stage 3 Laps: 110

Standings after the race

Drivers' Championship standings

Note: Only the first 12 positions are included for the driver standings.

References 

2022 NASCAR Xfinity Series
NASCAR races at Phoenix Raceway
United Rentals 200
United Rentals 200